Felimon Talusan Santos Jr. (born August 4, 1964) is a retired Filipino general who served as the former Chief of Staff of the Armed Forces of the Philippines. Prior to his appointment, he served as the commander of the AFP Eastern Mindanao Command, and the 7th Infantry Division. He is a graduate of the Philippine Military Academy "Sinagtala" Class of 1986.

Early life and education
General Santos was born on August 3, 1964, at San Rafael, Bulacan, and came from a family of farmers. He attended the Philippine Military Academy in 1982 and graduated in 1986 as part of the "Sinagtala" Class, and attended major courses locally and abroad, such as the Scout Ranger Course, the Military Intelligence Officer Basic Course, the Field Artillery Officer Basic and Advanced Courses, the Law of Armed Conflict and Human Right and International Law Training, the United Nations Military Observer and Staff Course in Ireland, the Comptroller Officer Basic Course, and the Command and General Staff Course at the Armed Forces of the Philippines Command and General Staff College. He also holds a Master's degree in Management at the Philippine Christian University.

Background
General Santos is a seasoned intelligence officer, and also commanded various units within the Philippine Army and the AFP, ranging from infantry, scout rangers, intelligence and field artillery units. He started his junior days as a platoon officer, executive officer and company commander at the 39th Infantry Battalion, 10 ID.

General Santos also served as the Chief Military Personnel Officer for Filipino Peacekeepers in the United Nations Disengagement Observer Force in Golan Heights, and led the 11th Intelligence Service Unit based in Davao, and served as the Assistant Chief of Unified Command for Operations, U3 of the AFP Central Command.

General Santos also served as the commander of the 703rd Infantry Brigade of the 7th Infantry Division, Assistant Commander of the 6th Infantry Division, Commander and Group Commander of the Philippine Army Intelligence and Security Group and Commander of the Philippine Army Civil Military Operations Regiment.

During his stint as Commander of the Philippine Army Intelligence and Security Group, he was involved the capture of Benito and Wilma Tiamzon, two of the most high-ranking officials of the Communist Party of the Philippines in 2014. He became the Deputy Chief of Staff for Intelligence, J2 in November 2016 to October 2017, where he earned his 2nd star and was promoted to Major General. He was involved the arrest of Abu Sayyaf finance officer Khair Mundos. He also led intelligence operations against the Abu Sayyaf in Sulu Province, and during the Battle of Marawi, where he assisted the final operations against eliminating the main leaders of the terrorists who laid siege to Marawi City, Omar Maute and Isnilon Hapilon.

General Santos became the commander of the 7th Infantry Division from October 2017 to January 2019, became the commander of the AFP Eastern Mindanao Command from January 2019 to January 2020, where he earned his third star and was promoted to Lieutenant General, before being promoted as the Chief of Staff of the Armed Forces of the Philippines on January 4, 2020, and obtained his fourth star, as well as promoted to the rank of General on January 27, 2020. On June 19, 2020, the position of Chief of Staff was renamed as Chairman of the Joint Chiefs, but was deferred a few months later. During his term as the AFP Chief, he spearheaded the disaster response operations in the aftermath of the 2020 Taal Volcano eruption and led overall medical and logistical support amidst the COVID-19 pandemic in the country.

General Santos retired from military service on August 3, 2020, where he was replaced by  his classmate, Gen. Gilbert Gapay.

Awards and decorations
Left Side:

Right Side:

Badges and Other Awards:
  Scout Ranger Qualification Badge
  AFP Command and General Staff Course Badge
  Honorary Special Forces Regiment Badge
 Army Transformational Roadmap Badge
 Dangal ng Lipi of the Province of Bulacan

Personal life
He is married to Margie Fe G. Santos, a native from Cotabato Province and a licensed nurse and businesswoman, and they have 2 daughters. After his retirement in the military, he now serves as a farmer in his family farm in San Rafael, Bulacan.

On March 27, 2020, he has tested positive for COVID-19. As of March 27, 2020, he is the 4th highest ranking Philippine Government official to have been infected with the SARS-CoV2 including Senator Zubiri, Senator Angara and Senator Pimentel.

References

1964 births
Living people
Chairmen of the Joint Chiefs (Philippines)
People from Bulacan
Philippine Army generals
Philippine Military Academy alumni
Philippine Military Academy Class of 1986
Recipients of the Philippine Republic Presidential Unit Citation
Recipients of the Outstanding Achievement Medal
Recipients of the Distinguished Service Star
Recipients of the Gold Cross (Philippines)
Recipients of the Bronze Cross Medal
Recipients of the Silver Wing Medal
Recipients of the Military Merit Medal (Philippines)
Recipients of the Military Civic Action Medal
Recipients of the Military Commendation Medal
Duterte administration personnel